Jagjit Kaur (1930 – 15 August 2021) was an Indian Hindi/Urdu singer and was married to the music director, Mohammed Zahur Khayyam.

Personal life and death 
Kaur belonged to an aristocratic family from Punjab. She married composer Mohammed Zahur Khayyam in 1954, one of the first inter-communal marriages in the Indian film industry. They had a son, Pradeep, who died of a heart attack in 2012. Inspired by their son's helping nature, they started a trust, "Khayyam Jagjit Kaur KPG Charitable Trust" to help artistes and technicians in need. Khayyam died on 19 August 2019 following a cardiac arrest at the age of 92. Kaur died on 15 August 2021.

Selected songs 
Some of her songs are the following:

 "Dekho dekho ji gori sasural chali" from Shagoon (1964), lyrics Sahir Ludhiyanvi, music Khayyam
 "Tum apna ranj–o-gham apni pareshani mujhe de do" from Shagoon
 "Khamosh zindagi ko afsaanaa mil gayaa" from Dil-e-Nadan (1953), lyrics Shakeel Badayuni, music Ghulam Mohammad
 "Chale aao saiyan rangeele main vaari re" (with Pamela Chopra) from Bazaar (1982), lyrics Jagjit Kaur, music Khayyam
 "Dekh lo aaaj humko jee bhar ke" from Bazaar
 "Kaahe ko byahi bides" from Umrao Jaan (1981), music Khayyam
 "Saada chidiya da chamba ve" by Jagjit Kaur and Pamela Chopra from Kabhi Kabhi (1976), music Khayyam
 "Chanda gaaye raagini" from Dil-e-Nadan
 "Pehle to ankh milana" (with Mohammed Rafi) from Shola Aur Shabnam (1961), lyrics Kaifi Azmi, music Khayyam
 "Ladi re ladi tujhse aankh jo ladi" from Shola aur Shabnam (1961)), lyrics Kaifi Azmi, music Khayyam
 "Nain milake pyar jata ke aag laga dee" (with Mohammed Rafi) from Mera Bhai Mera Dushman (1967), music Khayyam
Jagjit Kaur also composed Punjabi Movie music-(Satguru Teri Oat) 1974 Star cast like Dara Singh, Som Dutt

References

External links

1930 births
2021 deaths
Indian women folk singers
Indian folk singers
Singers from Punjab, India
Women musicians from Punjab, India
20th-century Indian singers
20th-century Indian women singers